Brender may refer to:

 Nikolaus Brender (born 1949), German journalist
 BRender, a development toolkit and graphics engine for computer software